RCA Studio or RCA Studios may refer to:

 RCA Studio A, a recording studio in Nashville, Tennessee, built in 1964
 RCA Studio B, a recording studio in Nashville, Tennessee, built in 1956
 RCA Studio New York, a recording studio in New York
 RCA Studio II, a 1970s video game console
 RCA Victor Studio (McGavock), a recording studio in Nashville rented from 1954 to 1957

See also 
 RCA Records